The Tsyklon-2 (Cyclone-2), also known as Tsiklon-2 and Tsyklon-M (known as SL-11 by the United States DoD), GRAU index 11K69, was a  Soviet, later Ukrainian, orbital carrier rocket used from the 1960s to the late 2000s. 
The rocket had 106 launches, one suborbital and 105 orbital, with only one failure and
92 consecutive successful launches, from 
27 December 1973 with the launch of Kosmos 626 to
25 June 2006 with the final flight of the Tsyklon-2,
which makes this launcher most reliable within rocket launched more than 100 times.

History
A derivative of the R-36 ICBM, and a member of the Tsyklon family, the Tsyklon-2 made its maiden flight on 6 August 1969, and conducted 106 flights, the last one occurring on 24 June 2006. It was the most reliable Soviet/Russian carrier rocket ever used,and launched more than 100 times having failed only once, and the second most reliable carrier rocket overall, behind the Atlas II that was launched only 63 times. Along with other R-36 family member Tsyklon-3, the Tsyklon-2 was retired in favor of new-generation and all-Russian carrier rockets, such as the Angara and Soyuz-2.

Description
Like the Tsyklon-3, the Tsyklon-2 was derived from the R-36 Scarp ICBM. However, it did not had  third stage, like the Tsyklon-3 did, also it was slightly shorter and had a lower weight mass when fueled.

See also
List of Tsyklon launches
Angara rocket
Dnepr rocket
Tsyklon

External links
Encyclopedia Astronautica- Tsyklon 2

References

Yuzhmash space launch vehicles
1973 in spaceflight
Space launch vehicles of the Soviet Union
Space launch vehicles of Ukraine